The following is a list of majority leaders of the North Dakota Senate, a position that was created in 1940 and first filled in 1941.

Notes

External links
State of North Dakota official website

Government of North Dakota

N